Zbigniew Spruch (born 13 December 1965 in Kożuchów) is a Polish former professional road bicycle racer. He won the Tour de Pologne in 1995 and placed second at the 2000 UCI Road World Championships.

Major results

1988
1st Stage 3 Peace Race
1989
Tour de Pologne
1st Stages 3 & 5
1st Stage 2 Peace Race
1991
Tour de Pologne
1st Stages 2, 3 & 4
1992
6th Trofeo Laigueglia
1993
5th Overall KBC Driedaagse van De Panne-Koksijde
1994
2nd Trofeo Pantalica
3rd Paris-Tours
6th Gent-Wevelgem
1995
1st  Overall Tour of Poland
1st Stage 2
4th Overall 4 Jours de Dunkerque
5th Overall Grand Prix du Midi Libre
1st Stage 1
6th Gent-Wevelgem
1996
9th Road race, Olympic Games
1997
2nd Overall Étoile de Bessèges
1998
1st Stage 1 Tour de Pologne
1st Stage 5 Settimana Ciclistica Lombarda
5th Overall Tirreno-Adriatico
1999
2nd Gent–Wevelgem
3rd Milan-San Remo
5th Tour of Flanders
9th Scheldeprijs
2000
2nd  Road race, UCI Road World Championships
4th Milan-San Remo
7th Paris-Tours
7th Overall KBC Driedaagse van De Panne-Koksijde
8th Amstel Gold Race
9th Tour of Flanders
2001
10th Paris-Tours

References

External links 
Palmarès by procyclingstats.com

Living people
Polish male cyclists
1965 births
Olympic cyclists of Poland
Cyclists at the 1996 Summer Olympics
Cyclists at the 2000 Summer Olympics
People from Kożuchów
Sportspeople from Lubusz Voivodeship